The Crying Game is a 1992 thriller film written and directed by Neil Jordan, produced by Stephen Woolley, and starring Stephen Rea, Miranda Richardson, Jaye Davidson, Adrian Dunbar, Ralph Brown, and Forest Whitaker. The film explores themes of race, sex, nationality, and sexuality against the backdrop of the Troubles in Northern Ireland.

The film follows Fergus (Rea), a member of the IRA, who has a brief but meaningful encounter with a British soldier, Jody (Whitaker), who is being held prisoner by the group. Fergus later develops an unexpected romantic relationship with Jody's lover, Dil (Davidson), whom Fergus promised Jody he would take care of. Fergus is forced to decide between what he wants and what his nature dictates he must do.

A critical and commercial success, The Crying Game won the BAFTA Award for Best British Film as well as the Academy Award for Best Original Screenplay, alongside Oscar nominations for Best Picture, Best Director, Best Actor for Rea, Best Supporting Actor for Davidson, and Best Film Editing. In 1999, the British Film Institute named it the 26th-greatest British film of all time.

Plot 
At a rural Northern Irish fairground, a Provisional IRA volunteer named Fergus (Stephen Rea) and a unit of other IRA members, led by Peter Maguire (Adrian Dunbar), kidnap a black British soldier named Jody (Forest Whitaker) after a female member of their unit, Jude (Miranda Richardson), lures Jody to a secluded area by promising sex. The unit intends to hold Jody until an imprisoned IRA member is released, and if their demands are not met within three days, he will be executed. Fergus—assigned to stand guard over Jody—begins bonding with him, and Jody tells Fergus the fable of the Scorpion and the Frog.

Realising he will most likely die, Jody requests Fergus to promise to seek out his girlfriend Dil (Jaye Davidson). When the deadline set by Jody's captors passes with their demands unmet, Fergus is ordered to take Jody into the woods to kill him. Fergus seemingly complies but when Jody attempts escape, Fergus pursues him without shooting him. Just as Jody escapes onto a road, a British armoured personnel carrier accidentally runs over and kills him. The British army attacks the IRA unit and Fergus manages to escape, believing that his companions have perished in the attack. Fergus escapes to London, taking a job as a day labourer under the alias "Jimmy".

A few months later, Fergus encounters Dil when he goes to have her cut his hair where she is a stylist at a hair salon. He follows her to a bar which proclaims it does karaoke every night and they flirt using Col the barman (Jim Broadbent) as an intermediary. Later, he cannot see Dil but she then appears in a sparkly dress on the karaoke stage singing "The Crying Game". A drunken man (who turns out to be Dil's boyfriend) torments Dil and drags her out. Fergus follows the pair, rescuing Dil, who asks him to kiss her in front of the boyfriend, and to ask her out again. Fergus soon begins falling in love with her and their relationship progresses, but when the two prepare to become intimate in her apartment, Dil reveals her transsexual status while undressing. An initially repulsed Fergus rushes to the bathroom to vomit after hitting Dil in the face, and then leaves her apartment. A few days later, Fergus leaves Dil a note in her mailbox apologising and the two reconcile. Despite initially being shocked by Dil's transsexuality, he is still taken by her. Around the same time, Jude unexpectedly reappears and tells Fergus the IRA has tried and convicted him of treason in absentia. She forces him to agree to help assassinate a British judge, and mentions that she knows about his affair, warning him that the IRA will kill Dil if he does not cooperate.

Fergus continues to woo Dil, cutting her hair short and dressing her in Jody's old cricket uniform as a disguise to shield her from possible retribution. The night before the IRA mission, Dil gets drunk and Fergus escorts her to her apartment, where she asks him to never leave her again. Fergus stays with her, and admits his role in Jody's death. Dil, drunk, appears not to understand; however, in the morning, before Fergus awakens, Dil restrains him by tying his arms and legs to the bed with stockings, leaving Fergus unable to complete the assassination. Holding Fergus at gunpoint with his own pistol, Dil demands that he tell her that he loves her and will never leave her; he complies, and she unties him.

Without Fergus present, an angered Maguire decides with Jude to proceed with the mission. Maguire underestimates the judge's protection, and an armed bodyguard shoots and kills him while Jude manages to escape. She vengefully enters Dil's flat with a gun, seeking to kill Fergus for missing the assassination. Dil subdues her and shoots her repeatedly after uncovering her part in Jody's death, finally killing her with a shot to the neck. She then points the gun at Fergus, but lowers it, saying that she cannot kill him because Jody will not allow her to. Fergus prevents Dil from shooting herself and tells her to go into hiding. He wipes her fingerprints off the gun, replaces them with his own, and allows himself to be arrested in her place. A few months later, Dil visits Fergus in prison and asks why he took the fall for her. He responds, "As a man once said, it's in my nature," and begins to tell her the story of the Scorpion and the Frog.

Cast 

 Stephen Rea as Fergus
 Miranda Richardson as Jude
 Forest Whitaker as Jody
 Jaye Davidson as Dil
 Adrian Dunbar as Peter Maguire
 Tony Slattery as Deveroux
 Jim Broadbent as Col
 Birdy Sweeney as Tommy
 Ralph Brown as Dave
 Andrée Bernard as Jane
 Joe Savino as Eddie
 Breffni McKenna as Tinker
 Jack Carr as Franknum

Production 
Neil Jordan first drafted the screenplay in the mid-1980s under the title The Soldier's Wife, but shelved the project after a similar film was released. 
A 1931 short story by Frank O'Connor called Guests of the Nation, in which IRA soldiers develop a bond with their English captives, whom they are ultimately forced to kill, partly inspired the story.  The original draft had the character Dil as a cisgender woman, but Jordan decided to make the character transgender at the premiere of his film The Miracle at the 41st Berlin International Film Festival in 1991.

Jordan sought to begin production of the film in the early 1990s, but found it difficult to secure financing, as the script's controversial themes and his recent string of box office flops discouraged potential investors. Several funding offers from the United States fell through because the funders wanted Jordan to cast a woman to play the role of Dil, believing that it would be impossible to find an androgynous male actor who could pass as female. Derek Jarman eventually referred Jordan to Jaye Davidson, who was completely new to acting, and was spotted by a casting agent while attending a premiere party for Jarman's film Edward II. Rea later said, "'If Jaye hadn't been a completely convincing woman, my character would have looked stupid'". The film included full-frontal "male" nudity on Davidson's part; he was filmed nude in the notable bedroom scene in which Dil's sexual anatomy was revealed.

The film went into production with an inadequate patchwork of funding, leading to a stressful and unstable filming process. The producers constantly searched for small amounts of money to keep the production going, and the unreliable pay left crew members disgruntled. Costume designer Sandy Powell had an extremely small budget to work with and ended up having to lend Davidson some of her own clothes to wear in the film, as the two happened to be the same size.

The film was known as The Soldier's Wife for much of its production, but Stanley Kubrick, a friend of Jordan, counselled against the title, which he said would lead audiences to expect a war film. The opening sequence was shot in Laytown, County Meath, Ireland, and the rest in London and Burnham Beeches, Buckinghamshire, England. The bulk of the film's London scenes were shot in the East End, specifically Hoxton and Spitalfields. Dil's flat is in a building facing onto Hoxton Square, with the exterior of the Metro on nearby Coronet Street. Fergus's flat and Dil's hair salon are both in Spitalfields. Chesham Street in Belgravia was the location for the assassination of the judge, with the now-defunct Lowndes Arms pub just around the corner.

Release 
The film was shown at festivals in Italy, the United States and Canada in September, and originally released in Ireland and the UK in October 1992, where it failed at the box office. Director Neil Jordan, in later interviews, attributed this failure to the film's heavily political undertone, particularly its sympathetic portrayal of an IRA fighter. The bombing of a pub in London is specifically mentioned as turning the English press against the film.

The then-fledgling film studio Miramax Films decided to promote the film in the U.S. where it became a sleeper hit. A memorable advertising campaign generated intense public curiosity by asking audiences not to reveal the film's "secret" regarding Dil's gender identity. Those surveyed by CinemaScore on opening night gave the film a grade "B" on a scale of A+ to F. Jordan also believed the film's success was a result of the film's British–Irish politics being either lesser-known or completely unknown to American audiences, who flocked to the film for what Jordan called "the sexual politics".

The film earned critical acclaim and was nominated for six Academy Awards, including Best Picture, Best Film Editing, Best Actor (Rea), Best Supporting Actor (Davidson) and Best Director. Writer-director Jordan finally won the Academy Award for Best Original Screenplay. The film went on to success around the world, including re-releases in Britain and Ireland.

Critical reception 
The Crying Game received worldwide acclaim from critics. The film has a 94%  rating on Rotten Tomatoes based on 67 reviews, with an average rating of 8.20/10. The consensus states, "The Crying Game is famous for its shocking twist, but this thoughtful, haunting mystery grips the viewer from start to finish."

Roger Ebert awarded the film a rating of four out of four stars, describing it in his review as one that "involves us deeply in the story, and then it reveals that the story is really about something else altogether" and named it "one of the best films of 1992".

Richard Corliss, in Time magazine, stated: "And the secret? Only the meanest critic would give that away, at least initially." He alluded to the film's secret by means of an acrostic, forming the sentence "she is a he" from the first letter of each paragraph.

Much has been written about The Crying Game'''s discussion of race, nationality, and sexuality. Theorist and author Jack Halberstam argued that the viewer's placement in Fergus's point of view regarding Dil being a transsexual reinforces societal norms rather than challenging them.The Crying Game was placed on over 50 critics' ten-best lists in 1992, based on a poll of 106 film critics.

Box office
The film grossed £2 million ($3 million) in the United Kingdom. In the United States and Canada it was more successful, grossing $62.5 million. Based on its US gross, it was the most successful film of the year on a cost to US gross basis. It grossed a total of $71 million worldwide.

 Awards and nominations 
 Academy Awards 

 British Academy Film Awards 

 Golden Globe Awards 

 Critics awards 

 Guild awards 

 Other awards 

 Soundtrack 
The soundtrack to the film, The Crying Game: Original Motion Picture Soundtrack'', released on 23 February 1993, was produced by Anne Dudley and Pet Shop Boys. Boy George scored his first hit since 1987 with his recording of the title song – a song that had been a hit in the 1960s for British singer Dave Berry. The closing rendition of Tammy Wynette's "Stand by Your Man" was performed by American singer Lyle Lovett.

 "The Crying Game" – Boy George
 "When a Man Loves a Woman" – Percy Sledge
 "Live for Today" (Orchestral) – Cicero and Sylvia Mason-James
 "Let the Music Play" – Carroll Thompson
 "White Cliffs of Dover" – The Blue Jays
 "Live for Today" (Gospel) – David Cicero
 "The Crying Game" – Dave Berry
 "Stand by Your Man" – Lyle Lovett
 "The Soldier's Wife"*
 "It's in my Nature"*
 "March to the Execution"*
 "I'm Thinking of You"*
 "Dies Irae"*
 "The Transformation"*
 "The Assassination"*
 "The Soldier's Tale"*

*Orchestral tracks composed by Anne Dudley and performed by the Pro Arte Orchestra of London

See also 
 Breakfast on Pluto (2005)
 List of films featuring the Irish Republican Army
 List of transgender characters in film and television
 List of transgender-related topics
 BFI Top 100 British films

References

External links 
 
 
 
 

1990s crime drama films
1992 films
1992 crime thriller films
1992 independent films
1992 LGBT-related films
1990s thriller drama films
BAFTA winners (films)
Bisexuality-related films
British crime thriller films
British independent films
British LGBT-related films
Irish LGBT-related films
1990s English-language films
English-language Irish films
English-language Japanese films
Films about interracial romance
Films about the Irish Republican Army
Films about The Troubles (Northern Ireland)
Films set in London
Films set in Northern Ireland
Films shot in Buckinghamshire
Films shot in Ireland
Films shot in London
LGBT-related political films
LGBT-related romantic drama films
LGBT-related thriller films
Political thriller films
Films about trans women
Films directed by Neil Jordan
Films produced by Elizabeth Karlsen
Palace Pictures films
Films whose writer won the Best Original Screenplay Academy Award
Anthony Award-winning works
Best British Film BAFTA Award winners
Independent Spirit Award for Best Foreign Film winners
Films scored by Anne Dudley
1992 drama films
Miramax films
1990s British films